Tünde  is a Hungarian feminine given name, derived from Hungarian tündér meaning "fairy". This name was coined by the Hungarian poet Mihály Vörösmarty in the 19th century in his work Csongor és Tünde (Csongor and Tünde).

With Csongor and Tünde, Vörösmarty has given new life to the fairy-tale forest whose last visitor was Shakespeare. Moving on Vörösmarty’s stage are fairies, imps, witches and cosmic deities. This fairy world naturally performs its dance on the poet’s magic carpet of language. (Antal Szerb)

June 1 is the Hungarian name day for Tünde.

Tünde is also used for the translation of "elf" in Tolkien's works.

People with the name "Tünde" include:
 Tünde Csonkics (b. 1958) chess player, woman grandmaster
 Tünde Frankó (b. 1966) opera singer
 Tünde Handó (b. 1962) jurist
 Tünde Kiszel (b. 1959) model, reporter, tabloid celeb
 Tünde Majsai-Nyilas (b. 1974) actress
 Tünde Murányi (b. 1966) actress
 Mária Tünde Novák (b. 1979/80) bank robber, author, "the Bonnie Parker of Hungary"
 Tünde Nyilas handball player
 Tünde Semmi-Kis (b. 1985) Miss World Hungary winner, stunt double
 Tünde Szabó (b. 1974) swimmer, politician
 Tünde Szabó (b. 1989) long distance runner
 Tünde Vaszi (b. 1972) Olympic longjumper
 Tünde Bartha (b. 1976) Czech state official of Hungarian origin

See also
 Tunde, unisex Yoruba name

References

Given names
Hungarian feminine given names